Eleonora Buratto (born 1982) is an Italian soprano opera singer.

Reception
Eduardo Benarroch found her to show "more than promise" as Nanetta in Verdi's Falstaff under Zubin Mehta in Salzburg in July 2013.

Her 2016 Metropolitan Opera debut as Norina in Donizetti's Don Pasquale was well received.

Discography

 I due Figaro, Saverio Mercadante. Riccardo Muti, Philharmonia Chor Wien, Orchestra Giovanile Luigi Cherubini. 2012
 Ariadne auf Naxos, Richard Strauss. Daniel Harding, Wiener Philharmoniker. DVD, 2012
 Falstaff, Giuseppe Verdi. Zubin Mehta, Wiener Philharmoniker. DVD 2013.

References

Living people
1982 births
Musicians from Mantua
Italian operatic sopranos
21st-century Italian women opera singers